Macrothele is a genus of mygalomorph spiders in the family Macrothelidae, and was first described by A. Ausserer in 1871. It is the only genus in the family Macrothelidae, and most species occur in Asia, from India to Japan, and Java, with five found in Africa, and two in Europe. The name is derived from Ancient Greek μακρός ("makro-"), meaning "big", and θηλή ("thele"), referring to the spinnerets.

Description

Males are smaller, sometimes only half that length. Macrothelids can be distinguished from other mygalomorph spiders by their larger posterior sigillae on the sternum, and the arrangement of the rows of teeth on the margin of the chelicerae: larger front-facing margin and smaller rear-facing.

These spiders build tube-webs or funnel-webs under rocks or logs, or in crevices in the ground.

Taxonomy
The genus Macrothele was erected by Anton Ausserer in 1871, with the type species being Macrothele calpeiana, formerly Mygale calpeiana.  Ausserer placed the genus in the then very broadly defined family Theraphosidae. It was later placed in the Dipluridae and the Hexathelidae before being transferred to the Macrothelidae in 2018. A molecular phylogenetic study in 2018 suggested that Macrothele was a distinct, early diverging lineage within the Mygalomorphae. Accordingly, Simon's subfamily Macrothelinae was elevated to the family Macrothelidae. There is some doubt if the western and eastern species should be grouped in the same genus.

The following cladogram shows the possible relationship of Macrothele to related taxa:

Species

, it contains 42 species and one subspecies from Africa, Asia and Europe:
Macrothele abrupta Benoit, 1965 – Congo
Macrothele alyrata (Mirza, Sanap & Kunte, 2017) – India
Macrothele amamiensis Shimojana & Haupt, 1998 – Japan (Ryukyu Is.)
Macrothele arcuata Tang, Zhao & Yang, 2020 – China
Macrothele bannaensis Xu & Yin, 2001 – China, Laos
Macrothele calpeiana (Walckenaer, 1805) (type) – Southern Europe, North Africa
Macrothele camerunensis Simon, 1903 – Cameroon, Equatorial Guinea
Macrothele cangshanensis Z. B. Yang, Zhao, Zhang & Z. Z. Yang, 2018 – China
Macrothele cretica Kulczyński, 1903 – Greece (Crete)
Macrothele decemnotata Simon, 1909 – Vietnam
Macrothele drolshageni Özkütük, Elverici, Yağmur & Kunt, 2019 – Turkey
Macrothele emei Lin & Li, 2021 – China
Macrothele gigas Shimojana & Haupt, 1998 – Japan (Ryukyu Is.)
Macrothele guizhouensis Hu & Li, 1986 – China
Macrothele hanfeii Lin & Li, 2021 – China (Hainan)
Macrothele holsti Pocock, 1901 – Taiwan
Macrothele hungae Lin & Li, 2021 – Taiwan
Macrothele incisa Benoit, 1965 – Congo
Macrothele jingzhao Chen, Jiang & Yang, 2020 – China
Macrothele jinlin Z. B. Yang, Zhao, Zhang & Z. Z. Yang, 2018 – China
Macrothele limenghuai Lin & Li, 2021 – China
Macrothele maculata (Thorell, 1890) – Myanmar, Indonesia (Sumatra, Java)
M. m. annamensis Hogg, 1922 – Vietnam
Macrothele menglunensis Li & Zha, 2013 – China
Macrothele mingsheng Wu & Z. Z. Yang, 2022 – China
Macrothele monocirculata Xu & Yin, 2000 – China
Macrothele multispine Wang, Li & Yang, 2019 – China
Macrothele nanning Lin & Li, 2021 – China
Macrothele proserpina Simon, 1909 – Vietnam
Macrothele raveni Zhu, Li & Song, 2000 – China
Macrothele sanheensis Tang, Zhao & Yang, 2020 – China
Macrothele segmentata Simon, 1892 – Malaysia
Macrothele simplicata (Saito, 1933) – Taiwan
Macrothele taiwanensis Shimojana & Haupt, 1998 – Taiwan
Macrothele triangularis Benoit, 1965 – Congo
Macrothele undata Tang, Zhao & Yang, 2020 – China
Macrothele vidua Simon, 1906 – India
Macrothele washanensis Wu & Z. Z. Yang, 2022 – China
Macrothele wuliangensis Wu & Z. Z. Yang, 2022 – China
Macrothele yaginumai Shimojana & Haupt, 1998 – Japan (Ryukyu Is.)
Macrothele yani Xu, Yin & Griswold, 2002 – China
Macrothele yongshengensis Z. B. Yang, Zhao & Z. Z. Yang, 2019 – China
Macrothele yunlingensis Z. B. Yang, Zhao & Z. Z. Yang, 2019 – China

See also
Raventoxin

References

 

Macrothelidae
Mygalomorphae genera
Spiders of Asia
Spiders of Africa